Hannam University (한남대학교) is a private Christian university in Daejeon, South Korea. It was founded in 1956.

Transition 
In February 1959, Linton (W.A.) was inaugurated as the first president of Daejeon University. The university has devoted its effort to foreign language and basic science education, and has secured foreign professors and has sufficient laboratory experience.

On the other hand, since 1983, Daejeon campus has been separated and Hannam University has started a new start.

In November 1985, the university was reorganized into a university, and Lee Won-seul was inaugurated as the first president.

Colleges
 College of Liberal Arts
 College of Education
 College of Natural Sciences
 College of Engineering
 College of Economics & Business Administration
 College of Law
 College of Social Sciences
 College of Art & Design
 College of Life Science & Nanotechnology
 Linton Global College Linton Global College
 Night College

Notable people
Kang Sung-yeon, actress
Kwon Sang-woo, actor
Park Gwang-hyun, actor

Ojeong-dong Mission Cousin 
Oh Jung-dong mission cousin is called 'Linton Academy' on campus and is located behind the College of Economics. This site was where missionaries lived from 1955 to 1958. In the Daejeon metropolitan city, the last three buildings built in 1955 were designated as cultural property data No. 44. The middle of the three is actually utilized as Indon Academy.

See also 
 List of colleges and universities in South Korea
 Education in South Korea

References

External links 
  
  

 
Universities and colleges in Daejeon
Private universities and colleges in South Korea
Association of Christian Universities and Colleges in Asia
1956 establishments in South Korea
Educational institutions established in 1956